Mandelieu-la-Napoule (locally spelled Mandelieu-La Napoule) is a commune in the Alpes-Maritimes department of the Provence-Alpes-Côte d'Azur region in Southeastern France. Located on the French Riviera, just to the southwest of Cannes and northeast of Théoule-sur-Mer, it had a population of 21 772 in 2020.

Townscape
It is known for the Château de la Napoule, a fortified castle of the 14th century. In the 20th century, Henry Clews Jr (son of the wealthy New York banker Henry Clews) and his wife Marie Clews, entirely renovated the château which they then inhabited.  Henry Clews Jr was a painter and sculptor whose work still fills the castle, which is now run as a non-profit arts foundation by his descendants. The château was once an ancient foundation, then a medieval fortress of the Counts of Villeneuve. Today the Roman Tower (4th century) and the Saracen Tower (11th century) are all that remain of the château that was destroyed during the French Revolution.  The château designed by the Clews has cloister, terrace overlooking the Mediterranean Sea, Gothic dining room, and studio. In the basement of a tower at the château the remains of Henry (1876–1937) and Marie (1878–1959) are interred in two tombs that Henry designed and sculpted.

Population

Transportation
Private air transportation for the town (and for nearby Cannes) is provided by Cannes - Mandelieu Airport. The nearest major airport is Nice Cote d'Azur Airport, the second busiest airport in France; it is about 30 minutes drive from the airport to the town. The commune is reached from exit 41 on the autoroute A8. Mandelieu-la-Napoule station is served by regional trains (TER Provence-Alpes-Côte d'Azur) towards Fréjus, Cannes, Nice and Les Arcs–Draguignan.

Personalities
It is the home of ex MI6 agent Richard Tomlinson.

Bertrand of Orléans-Braganza was born in Mandelieu on 2 February 1941. He is the present head of the Vassouras Branch of the Brazilian Imperial House and de jure Emperor of Brazil (Bertrand I of Brazil). He is also considered a royal prince of the deposed monarchies of France and Portugal. His late brother Luiz of Orléans-Braganza was also born there three years before.

Italian Princess Maria Francesca of Savoy, daughter of the King of Italy Victor Emmanuel III and Queen Elena of Montenegro, lived in Mandelieu and died there on 7 December 2001.

Italian athlete Eddy Ottoz was born in Mandelieu on 3 June 1944. He competed for Italy in the 1964 Summer Olympics held in Tokyo, Japan and in the 1968 Summer Olympics in Mexico City, Mexico, where he won the bronze medal in the 110 metre hurdles event.

Gallery

References

External links

 Official web site
 Official tourism Website: in French, in English
 Map of Mandelieu-La Napoule (PDF)
 Mandelieu-La Napoule Exhibition-Congress Centre

Communes of Alpes-Maritimes
Alpes-Maritimes communes articles needing translation from French Wikipedia